Tasmeen Granger (born 12 August 1994) is a Zimbabwean cricketer. She represented Zimbabwe in ICC Women's World Twenty20 Qualifier in 2013 and 2015.

In July 2019, she was one of four Zimbabwe women cricketers barred by the International Cricket Council (ICC) from playing in a Global Development Squad, due to play against Women's Cricket Super League teams, following the ICC's suspension of Zimbabwe Cricket earlier in the month. In February 2021, she was named in Zimbabwe's squad for their home series against Pakistan.

In October 2021, Granger was named in Zimbabwe's Women's One Day International (WODI) squad for their four-match series against Ireland. The fixtures were the first WODI matches after Zimbabwe gained WODI status from the ICC in April 2021. She made her WODI debut on 9 October 2021, for Zimbabwe against Ireland.

References

External links 

1994 births
Living people
Zimbabwean women cricketers
Zimbabwe women One Day International cricketers
Zimbabwe women Twenty20 International cricketers
Sportspeople from Bulawayo
Tuskers women cricketers